Broadway Bank is a community bank founded in 1941, founded by Col. Charles E. Cheever Sr. and his wife, Elizabeth Cheever. Broadway Bank has thirty-nine banking centers in San Antonio, Austin and the Texas Hill Country.

History 
Founded as "Broadway National Bank of Alamo Heights", the company began in a small store front in Alamo Heights, Texas in 1941, by a military officer, Col. Charles E. Cheever Sr., and his wife, Elizabeth Cheever. The primary purpose was to serve military families who were migrating to the Central Texas area.

In 1959, it was the first San Antonio bank to establish a mortgage lending division, and it was the first to extend its banking hours to help working families. In 1984, the bank began to offer a successful Wealth Management Division.

In April 2016, Broadway Bank announced the appointment of David Bohne as its new chief executive officer. Bohne replaced longtime CEO Jim Goudge.

Current operations 
Broadway Bank is still owned by the Cheever family. At the end of 2018, the bank had $3.65 billion in assets, with $3.15 billion in deposits, and was the third-largest bank in San Antonio.

References

External links 

 

Banks based in Texas
Banks established in 1941
Companies based in San Antonio